Henry Louis Stram (January 3, 1923 – July 4, 2005) was an American football coach.  He is best known for his 15-year tenure with the Dallas Texans / Kansas City Chiefs of the American Football League (AFL) and National Football League (NFL).

Stram won three AFL championships, more than any other coach in the league's history. He then won Super Bowl IV with the Chiefs.  He also coached the most victories (87), had the most post-season games (7) and the best post-season record in the AFL (5–2). Stram is largely responsible for the introduction of Gatorade to the NFL due to his close association with Ray Graves, coach at the University of Florida during Gatorade's development and infancy.  Stram never had an offensive coordinator, defensive coordinator, or special teams coach during his career with the Texans and Chiefs.

Biography

Early life
Stram was born in Chicago on January 3, 1923. His Polish-born father, Henry Wilczek, wrestled professionally under the name Stram and the family name was changed accordingly. He later grew up in Gary, Indiana, and graduated from Lew Wallace High School class of 1941. (The football stadium press box was renamed in his honor.) He earned seven letters playing football and baseball and joined the Sigma Chi fraternity at Purdue in the 1940s, playing in 1942 and again in 1946 and 1947. Stram served in the United States Army Air Forces during World War II, interrupting his university career.

Coaching career

Early jobs
He was an assistant football coach for the Boilermakers from 1948 to 1955 and the head baseball coach from 1951 to 1955. In 1996, Stram and Len Dawson were inducted into the Purdue Athletic Hall of Fame. After coaching at Purdue, Stram was an assistant at Notre Dame, Southern Methodist University, and Miami. Stram was Miami's backfield coach and credited with installing the multiple offense that helped lead the team to a 6–4 record in 1959.

Dallas Texans / Kansas City Chiefs
In 1959, Lamar Hunt recruited Stram to coach his Dallas Texans in the new AFL, which commenced play in 1960.  Hunt had previously been a bench player at SMU when Stram had been coaching there and the Texans' position had been turned down by Bud Wilkinson and Tom Landry, then an assistant at the New York Giants. The Texans played their first game in the new AFL in September 1960 and proved to be successful from the beginning.

In 1962, the Texans won the AFL Western Division and the AFL championship. The Texans won the championship against the Houston Oilers 20-17 in what was the longest professional football championship game ever played. Tommy Brooker kicked a field goal at 17:54 of overtime to win the game for the Texans and stop the Oilers from winning their third straight title.

The Dallas Texans became the Kansas City Chiefs in 1963 and continued their success. In 1966, they won the AFL title again on the back of one of the best defensive teams in the history of professional football featuring three hall of famers and eight all star players. The Chiefs defeated the Buffalo Bills 31–7 in Buffalo. The Chiefs played the Green Bay Packers in Super Bowl I with the Packers winning 35–10. To overcome the Chiefs' defense, Packers' coach Vince Lombardi used a short passing game which proved successful, with quarterback Bart Starr becoming the first Super Bowl MVP.

In a 1968 game against the Oakland Raiders in Kansas City, the Chiefs entered the game without a healthy wide receiver ready to play.  Stram went in to pro football's past and resurrected the T formation.  The Chiefs won the game 24-10 running the ball 60 times for over 300 yards while passing only three times for 16 yards.

The Kansas City Chiefs won the AFL championship again in 1969. In Super Bowl IV, his ingenious innovations, the "moving pocket" and the "triple-stack defense", dominated the Minnesota Vikings on both sides of the ball.  In the Super Bowl, Stram became the first professional football coach to wear a microphone.  Stram's recorded comments from that game have become classics: "Just keep matriculatin' the ball down the field, boys.", "How could all six of you miss that play?" "65 Toss Power Trap", "Kassulke was running around there like it was a Chinese fire drill", and his assessment of the Vikings' ineffectual play: "You can't do that in OUR league!".  In the clip where he asks a referee "How could all six of you miss that play?" the referee's response leads the confused Stram to mutter, "No.  What?" The Super Bowl victory was the second straight by a team from the AFL and added credibility to the newer league, which would complete a planned merger with the NFL the following season.

In 1971, the Chiefs won the AFC Western Division championship. The Miami Dolphins defeated the Chiefs on Christmas Day 1971. The teams played the longest game in the history of professional football. After that, the Chiefs did not enjoy the same success, resulting in Stram leaving the franchise. Stram's tenure in Kansas City ended with a 35–15 loss at home to the same Viking team the Chiefs defeated in Super Bowl IV.

Following a 5-9 finish in the 1974 season, which was at the time the worst record in franchise history, Stram was fired.

New Orleans Saints
Stram became the head coach of the New Orleans Saints in 1976, but posted losing records in his two seasons, 4–10 and 3–11. Hampering Stram's efforts to rebuild the typically struggling Saints was a severe elbow injury to quarterback Archie Manning, who missed the entire 1976 season and parts of the 1977 campaign. Stram also had to deal with continuous discipline problems caused by his leading rusher, Chuck Muncie, who was in the early stages of a cocaine addiction which would lead to his trade in 1980 from New Orleans to the San Diego Chargers.

Perhaps the biggest highlight of his New Orleans tenure was a 27–17 win over his former team, the Kansas City Chiefs, at Arrowhead Stadium in 1976, Stram's first victory with the Saints.  The 1977 campaign culminated in an historic home loss to the previously winless Tampa Bay Buccaneers who were riding a 26-game losing streak over two seasons. Stram took the loss hard, burning the game film. He was fired after the final game of the season.

Legacy
Stram was an innovator, a shrewd judge of talent, and an excellent teacher.  He helped develop Hall of Famers Len Dawson, Bobby Bell, Buck Buchanan, Curley Culp, Willie Lanier, Jan Stenerud, Emmitt Thomas, and Johnny Robinson, and others like Ed Budde and Otis Taylor.  He was also the first coach in professional football to use Gatorade on his sidelines and run both the I formation and two-tight end offense, still used in professional football today.  On defense, the Chiefs employed a triple-stack defense, hiding the three linebackers behind defensive linemen.

He was considered a motivational genius, and his emphasis on the Chiefs' wearing of a patch commemorating the AFL in Super Bowl IV was one of his typical ploys, extracting maximum effort from players who had been derided by proponents of the NFL. Stram was inducted into the Pro Football Hall of Fame in 2003, nine years after Bud Grant, the man whose team he had convincingly defeated in Super Bowl IV, had been enshrined.  At the Hall of Fame ceremonies, Stram was so weakened by the effects of diabetes that Len Dawson pushed his former coach onto the stage in a wheelchair. Stram's induction speech was then played from a previously recorded videotape.

Broadcasting career
Following his retirement from coaching, Stram enjoyed a long and successful career as a color commentator on CBS' television and radio broadcasts of NFL games. Stram began broadcasting games for CBS in 1975, originally calling games with Frank Glieber. After a brief hiatus so he could return to coaching, Stram returned to call games with Gary Bender in 1978. His other broadcast partners were Jack Buck, Vin Scully, Curt Gowdy, Dick Stockton, Tim Brant, Steve Zabriskie, Jim Henderson, Sean McDonough, and Jim Nantz, along with various others.  From 1979 through 1989 he also called the Tampa Bay Buccaneers' preseason football games for WTOG-TV in Tampa, Florida.

As a broadcaster, Stram is best remembered for his near-20-year stint (beginning in 1978 and lasting through the 1995 season) with Jack Buck on CBS Radio broadcasts of Monday Night Football games. Stram's key broadcasting trademark was his habit of predicting the next play before it happened.

On January 10, 1982, Stram, along with Vin Scully, called the famous NFC Championship Game between the San Francisco 49ers and the Dallas Cowboys. The game in question was immortalized by Dwight Clark's touchdown catch which elevated the 49ers into their first Super Bowl appearance (the first of four during the 1980s).

During a 1988 broadcasting trip to Indianapolis for a Chicago Bears–Colts game, Stram collapsed with a severely blocked aortic valve and underwent open heart surgery. He was hospitalized in Indianapolis for a week and later resumed his career with CBS.

He remained a part of CBS' television broadcast team until 1993. His last game as a broadcaster was Super Bowl XXX for CBS Radio in 1996.

Personal life
Stram married Phyllis Marie Pesha in 1953 and they stayed together as husband and wife until his death due to complications from diabetes in 2005. They had six children, four sons and two daughters, including actor Henry Stram.

Later life and death
Stram made a guest appearance as himself on the TV show Coach. In the episode, Stram was attending a coaching convention with fellow coaches Barry Switzer and George Allen.  Hayden Fox, the fictional protagonist of the show, also attended the conference.

Hank Stram retired to New Orleans, Louisiana, where he built a home in the town of Covington.  He died at St. Tammany Parish hospital in Covington, from complications due to diabetes, on July 4, 2005.

Head coaching record

See also
 American Football League players, coaches, and contributors
 List of Kansas City Chiefs head coaches
 List of National Football League head coaches with 50 wins

References

Sources
Hank Stram with Lou Sahadi, They're Playing My Game, Morrow, New York 1986 
Edward Gruver, The American Football League: A Year-by-Year History 1960–1969 McFarland & Company 1997 
Brad Adler, Coaching Matters: Leadership & Tactics of the NFL's Ten Greatest Coaches Brassey's Inc 2003 pages 56–57 
"Stram gets Texan post", Dallas Morning News December 21, 1959
"Texans now rule AFL kingdom", Dallas Morning News December 24, 1962
MacCambridge, Michael (2005), America's Game. New York:Anchor Books.

External links
 
 

1923 births
2005 deaths
American football running backs
College football announcers
Dallas Texans (AFL) coaches
Kansas City Chiefs head coaches
Miami Hurricanes football coaches
New Orleans Saints head coaches
Notre Dame Fighting Irish football coaches
Purdue Boilermakers baseball coaches
Purdue Boilermakers baseball players
Purdue Boilermakers football coaches
Purdue Boilermakers football players
SMU Mustangs football coaches
National Football League announcers
Pro Football Hall of Fame inductees
Sportspeople from Gary, Indiana
Baseball players from Gary, Indiana
Players of American football from Gary, Indiana
Baseball players from Chicago
Players of American football from Chicago
Super Bowl-winning head coaches
United States Army Air Forces personnel of World War II
American people of Polish descent
Deaths from diabetes